Lieutenant General Raj Shukla, PVSM,YSM, SM, ADC is a retired General Officer of the Indian Army who served as the General Officer Commanding-in-Chief of the Army Training Command (GOC-in-C ARTRAC). He assumed office on 1 May 2020, succeeding Lt Gen P C Thimayya. He superannuated on 31 March 2022.

Early life and education 
Shukla is an alumnus of Uttar Pradesh Sainik School Lucknow , National Defence Academy Khadakwasla Pune and Indian Military Academy.
Shukla was commissioned into the Regiment of Artillery in December 1982. He has also attended the Defence Services Staff College, the Higher Defence Management Course at the College of Defence Management and the National Defence College.

Career 
Shukla has commanded a Medium Regiment in the Eastern theatre as part of a Mountain Division. He later took the regiment to the Desert as part of a Strike Corps. He has also commanded an Infantry brigade in Counter-insurgency operations and an infantry division in the Kashmir Valley, along the Line of Control. He is a qualified aviator and has flown along the borders in Sikkim and in the North–East.

In his staff appointments, Shukla has served as the General Staff Officer, Grade I (GSO-I) of an infantry division as well as two tenures in the Military Operations directorate at Army Headquarters. He has also served in instructional appointments in the School of Artillery and the Indian Military Training Team in Bhutan.

On 5 July 2018, Shukla took command of the X Corps at Bhatinda from Lt Gen P C Thimayya. After an year's stint at the helm of X Corps, he relinquished command on 30 July 2019, handing over to Lt Gen Ajai Singh. He subsequently took over as the Director General Perspective Planning (DGPP) at Integrated Headquarters of the Ministry of Defence.

On 1 May 2020, Shukla took over as the General Officer Commanding-in Chief Army Training Command from Lt Gen P C Thimayya.

Shukla has been a Research Fellow at the Institute for Defense Studies and Analyses and a visiting fellow at the Centre for Land Warfare Studies.

Military awards and decorations
He is a recipient of the Param Vishisht Seva Medal, Yudh Seva Medal and the Sena Medal.

Dates of rank

References 

Indian generals
Living people
Recipients of the Sena Medal
Recipients of the Yudh Seva Medal
Indian Army officers
National Defence Academy (India) alumni
Year of birth missing (living people)
Recipients of the Param Vishisht Seva Medal
College of Defence Management alumni